Coloman of Stockerau (died 18 October 1012) was an Irish saint. While on pilgrimage to the Holy Land, he was mistaken for a spy and hanged near Vienna.

Life
Originally known as Colmán (variously rendered Koloman, Kálmán, Colman, and Colomannus), he was an Irish pilgrim en route to the Holy Land and was mistaken for a spy because of his strange appearance. He was tortured and hanged at Stockerau, near Vienna, Austria, on 16 July 1012.<ref>[http://catholicsaints.info/book-of-saints-colman-23-october/ Monks of Ramsgate. "Colman". //Book of Saints, 1921. CatholicSaints.Info. 11 October 2012]</ref> Later tradition has it that he was "a son of Máel-Sechnaill (d. 1022), high king of Ireland." (Breen, 2009)

At the time of his death, there were continual skirmishes among Austria, Moravia, and Bohemia. Coloman spoke no German, so he could not give an understandable account of himself. He was hanged alongside several robbers.

According to Aidan Breen, "He was made a saint by the local people, possibly out of remorse for the deed and because of his endurance under torture and the many miracles reported from where his body was buried." (Breen, 2009)

Veneration
 
On 13 October 1014, his relics were transferred to the Abbey of Melk by Bishop Megingard at the request of Marquis Henry of Austria. Decades later, they were taken to Hungary.  Coleman became the object of a popular cult, and many churches and chapels in Austria, the Electorate of the Palatinate, Hungary, and Bavaria were dedicated to him.  He is also venerated in Ireland.

A legend states that Coloman's body remained incorruptible for eighteen months, remaining undisturbed by birds and beasts.  The scaffolding itself is said to have taken root and to have blossomed with green branches, one of which is preserved under the high altar of the Franciscan church at Stockerau.

Géza I of Hungary named one of his sons, King Coloman of Hungary, in his honor. In the 13th century, the younger brother of King Bela IV of Hungary was named Coloman of Galicia-Lodomeria in honor of Coloman.

Eventually, the relics of Coloman were taken back from the Cathedral of Székesfehérvár to Melk Abbey in Austria, where they are still kept. Many Austrian rulers made modifications to the tomb of Coloman, and the actual reliquary was made in the Baroque style.

 See also 
Incorruptibles

References

Sources
"Coleman", by Aidan Breen, Dictionary of Irish Biography, page 696, volume two, 2009. 

External links

Saint of the Day, October 13: Coloman of Stockerau at SaintPatrickDC.orgSaint Coloman's Day
Catholic Online: St. Coloman
Saint Coloman of Stockerau at Saints.SQPN.com''
 

10th-century births
1012 deaths
11th-century Christian saints
Medieval Irish saints on the Continent
11th-century Christian martyrs
People from Korneuburg District
Incorrupt saints